El Puma may refer to:
José Luis Rodríguez (singer), a Venezuelan singer/actor, nicknamed El Puma 
José Luis Rodríguez (footballer, born 1963), Argentine, nicknamed El Puma
Carlos Landín Martínez, a Mexican convicted drug lord, nicknamed El Puma